Almir may refer to Brazilian footballer Almir de Souza Fraga (born 1969), who is known as Almir. Almir is also a given name for notable individuals such as the following:

Given name

Football
Almir Aganspahić (born 1996), Bosnian-Herzegovinian footballer 
Almir Ajzeraj (born 1997), Kosovo Albanian footballer 
Almir Moraes Andrade (born 1973), Brazilian footballer
Almir Bajramovski (born 1982), Macedonian football
Almir Barbosa (born 1980), Cape Verdean footballer
Almir Bekić (born 1989), Bosnian-Herzegovinian footballer 
Almir Ćubara (born 1997), Bosnian footballer
Almir Gegić (born 1979), Serbian footballer
Almir Gredić (born 1976), Bosnian-Herzegovinian footballer
Almir Hurtić, Bosnian-Herzegovinian football player and coach
Almir Kayumov (1964 – 2013), Russian football player and referee
Almir Memić (footballer, born 1962), Bosnian football manager and former footballer
Almir Memić (footballer, born 1975), Bosnian former footballer
Almir Mukhutdinov (born 1985), Kazakhstani footballer
Almir Pernambuquinho (1937 – 1973), Brazilian footballer
Almir Pliska (born 1987), Bosnian-Herzegovinian footballer
Almir Rahmanović (born 1986), Slovenian footballer 
Almir Soto (born 1994), Colombian footballer
Almir Sulejmanović (born 1978), Slovenian footballer
Almir Tanjič (born 1979), Slovenian footballer
Almir Tolja (born 1964), Bosnian-Herzegovinian footballer
Almir Turković (born 1970), Bosnian-Herzegovinian football player and coach
Almir Lopes de Luna (born 1982), Brazilian footballer known as  Almir

Other sports
Almir Aganović (born 1973), Bosnian volleyball player
Almir Bentemps, Italian luger
Almir Pandzo (born 1992), Bosnian handball player
Almir Velagić (born 1981), Bosnian-Herzegovinian weightlifter
Almir Nelson de Almeida, (1923 – 1977), Brazilian basketball player known as Almir
Almir dos Santos (born 1993), Brazilian athlete

Other
Almir Čehajić, also known as Batko, Bosnian entertainer
Almir Chediak (1950 – 2003), Brazilian music executive
Almir Guineto stage name of Almir de Souza Serra (1946 – 2017), Brazilian music entertainer
Almir Sater (born 1956), Brazilian entertainer

Middle name
Jose Almir Barros Neto (born 1985), Brazilian Footballer known as Almir

See also

Aamir (given name)
Aamir (disambiguation)
Admir
Almer (disambiguation)
Almira (disambiguation)
Amir (disambiguation)
Amir (name)
Elmir
Ilmir